The Baháʼí 7, also known as the "Yaran" (friends), are seven Iranian Baháʼí community leaders arrested in 2008 that have served 10-year prison sentences in Iran. The seven prisoners of conscience are Mahvash Sabet, Fariba Kamalabadi, Jamaloddin Khanjani, Afif Naeimi, Saeid Rezaie, Behrouz Tavakkoli, and Vahid Tizfahm.

Background

Because the Baháʼí Faith has no clergy, the adherents will chose a Spiritual Assembly, at a local or national level, to carry out the affairs of the community.

While there had been a history of persecution of Baháʼís in Iran, this was elevated to an official state-sanctioned persecution following the 1979 Iranian Revolution. 

In 1980, the nine members of the National Spiritual Assembly were arrested by the Islamic Revolutionary Guard Corps and never heard from again, though the authorities never acknowledged that the group (plus two others with them when they were arrested) had been executed. In 1981, eight of the nine members of the replacement National Spiritual Assembly were arrested and executed; unlike the first Assembly, the Central Revolutionary Courts did acknowledge that the executions of the second Assembly had occurred. In 1983, the Attorney-General of the Revolution announced a ban on all administrative and community activities of the Baháʼí community in Iran. Though the members of the third incarnation of the National Spiritual Assembly disbanded, seven of them were arrested and executed between 1984 and 1987, as acknowledged by the Revolutionary authorities.

Following the 1983 disbandment of the National Spiritual Assembly, a number of Iranian Baháʼís formed a group to informally serve the needs of the country's adherents on an ad hoc basis. The group's membership evolved over the next 25 years, and was made up of the Baháʼí 7 as of March 2008.

Arrests and detention
Sabet was detained on 5 March 2008 after being summoned to Mashhad by the Ministry of Intelligence. Officers from the Ministry of Intelligence arrested the other six leaders in raids on their homes on 14 May 2008.

The seven were held in Evin Prison in Section 209, which is run by the Ministry of Intelligence, and were denied access to a lawyer. The five male detainees reportedly were placed in one cell together measuring 10m2 and without any beds.

Charges and trial
On 11 February 2009, the Deputy Prosecutor of Tehran said that the case against the "seven defendants in the case of the illegal Bahai group" would be sent in next week to the Revolutionary Court and they would be charged with "espionage for Israel, insulting religious sanctities and propaganda against the system." In response, Amnesty International stated that it "considers the charges to be politically motivated and those held to be prisoners of conscience, detained solely because of their conscientiously held beliefs or their peaceful activities on behalf of the Baha'i community. If convicted, they would face lengthy prison terms, or even the death penalty."

In May 2009, the families of the detainees were told that the seven were now facing the additional charge of mofsed-e-filarz (spreading corruption on earth), which can carry the death penalty. The families were also informed that their detained relatives were scheduled to appear on 11 July 2009 before Branch 28 of the Revolutionary Court in Tehran to face the charges. The scheduled 11 July appearance was delayed and no new trial was given.

The first session of the trial was held on January 12, 2010 before the Revolutionary Court in Tehran. Government authorities reportedly attempted to bar the Baháʼís' lawyers from the courtroom, but were permitted access after insisting upon entering. Sessions were also held on February 7 and 12 April 2010. At the latter session, the seven Baháʼí and their lawyers reportedly "refused to participate in the proceedings when they saw Ministry of Intelligence interrogators and a film crew at what was supposed to be a closed hearing."

On 7 August 2010, the Revolutionary Court in Tehran convicted the seven Baháʼí of crimes including "espionage for Israel", "insulting religious sanctities" and "propaganda against the system," and sentenced them to 20 years imprisonment. In response, Amnesty International called for their immediate release, describing the verdict as "a sad and damning manifestation of the deeply-rooted discrimination against Baha'is by the Iranian authorities."

In September 2010, an appeal court acquitted the seven Baháʼí of some of the charges, including espionage, and consequently, their sentences were reduced to 10 years. In March 2011, however, Iranian authorities reinstated the 20-year sentences.

Completion of prison terms
On September 18, 2017, Mahvash Sabet was released from prison. Two days later Senator John McCain commented on being unified with the Baháʼís on her release and condemning her imprisonment. During her imprisonment, Sabet wrote many poetry books that were smuggled out and published. She is an acclaimed writer and a poet.

On October 31, 2017, Fariba Kamalabadi was released "after completing a 10-year prison sentence. Her release follows that of Mahvash Sabet, a teacher, poet and also a former member of the group, the Yaran (or friends) ... Five other members of the group remain in jail...".

On March 17, 2018, then 85-year-old Jamaloddin Khanjani was released, "...the oldest of the seven, is the fifth to be released since September 2017...".

On December 21, 2018, Afif Naeimi became "...the last of seven imprisoned former leaders of the country’s Baha’i minority" to be released from prison.

Reactions
In May 2013, a group of United Nations human rights officials called on Iranian authorities to immediately release the seven Baháʼí members.

The imprisonment of this group, particularly the story of Fariba Kamalabadi was the subject of Afghan-American filmmaker Misaq Kazimi's documentary.

See also
 Persecution of Baháʼís

References

External links
 
 Timeline on Baháʼí Library Online

Amnesty International prisoners of conscience held by Iran
Bahá'í Faith in Iran
Iranian Bahá'ís
Human rights abuses in Iran
Prisoners and detainees of Iran
Iranian prisoners and detainees
Persecution of Bahá'ís